The Leopold Prize may refer to one of the following awards:

 Grand Prix Charles-Leopold Mayer (Charles-Léopold Mayer Prize), awarded annually by the Académie des Sciences (French Academy of Sciences) de l'Institut de France (the French Institute)
 Leopold (prize), a biennial German media prize for music for children
 Leopold Griffuel Prize (Prix Leopold Griffuel), sponsored by the French ARC Foundation for Cancer Research
 Richard W. Leopold Prize, awarded biennially by the Organization of American Historians (OAH)